A 12-hour run is a form of ultramarathon in which each competitor tries to run as far as possible in 12 hours. The event is typically held on  loops, but sometimes is held on  tracks. Some races are held on trails and others are held on sidewalks in city parks. Top runners will often run  or more (the best doing about ), depending on conditions. Some participants will have a crew to help them, while others set up a camp with their equipment and supplies near the starting area, with good access from each loop.

Records

See also
One hour run
24-hour run

References

Events in track and field
Ultramarathons